InCa3D is a simulation tool dedicated to electrical connection modelling for both: 
 Electromagnetic compatibility
 Power electronics

The software employs finite element analysis based on the PEEC Partial element equivalent circuit method  which proved to be efficient to solve Maxwell's equations in low and middle frequency, thanks to its ability to convert interconnections geometry into equivalent RLC circuit, thus avoiding polygonal meshing of the air around the device. 

InCa3D is developed in France (in collaboration with G2ELab) and distributed by Altair Engineering Inc.

Main application fields 
InCa3D is well suited for modelling the behaviour of various connectors, 
 from ICs, small wire bonds and PCBs tracks,
 up to bus bars, power modules and large distribution switchboards.

References

Other links 
Partial element equivalent circuit method 
Busbar Design: How to Spare Nanohenries ?

External links 
 Official site
 The G2Elab research center

Simulation software
Computer-aided design software
Computer-aided engineering software